Indira Gandhi University, Rewari (IGU) is a state university which was established in the year 2013 and which is located in Village Meerpur, Rewari, Haryana, India. It established in 2013 by the Government of Haryana.

History

The university began its way as the Post Graduate Regional Centre of Maharishi Dayanand University, established in 1988. It was established under Haryana Act No.29 of 2013 and started functioning on 13 September 2013.

Campus

Faculties 
The university includes the following faculties:

 Faculty of Humanities
 Faculty of Social Sciences
 Faculty of Physical Sciences
 Faculty of Life Sciences
 Faculty of Faculty of Education
 Faculty of Education
 Faculty of Law
 Faculty of Commerce, Management & Tourism Management
 Faculty of Pharmaceutical Sciences
 Faculty of Engineering & Technology
 Faculty of Faculty of Earth, Environment & Space Sciences

References

External links
 

Indira Gandhi University, Rewari
Monuments and memorials to Indira Gandhi
Educational institutions established in 2013
2013 establishments in Haryana